Xanthomorda guineensis is a beetle in the genus Xanthomorda of the family Mordellidae. It was described in 1969 by Ermisch.

References

Mordellidae
Beetles described in 1969